DXFE may refer to:
 DXFE-AM, an AM radio station broadcasting in Davao City
 DXFE-FM, an FM radio station broadcasting in Iligan, branded as Yes The Best